The Lawrence Memorial Library was designed in Springfield, Illinois in 1905 by American architect Frank Lloyd Wright for client Susan Lawrence Dana. Wright had designed Susan Lawrence Dana's home, also in Springfield, in 1902–04. 

Dana commissioned the library for the West Room of the Rheuna D. Lawrence School. The school was named after her father, who had been the president of the School Board of Springfield until his death in 1901. 

According to William Allin Storrer, the memorial library was mostly demolished, but restored in 1993.

Sources 
 Storrer, William Allin. The Frank Lloyd Wright Companion. University Of Chicago Press, 2006,  (S.073)

References

1905 establishments in Illinois
Frank Lloyd Wright buildings
Libraries in Illinois
Buildings and structures in Springfield, Illinois